Mohammad Ibrahim al-Shaar (born 1950) is a Syrian military leader who was later named Syrian Minister of the Interior.

Early life
Shaar was born into a Sunni family in the rural village of Hafa in Latakia Governorate in 1950.

Career
Shaar joined the armed forces in 1971 and held a number of security positions, including chief of the military security in Tartous, the chief of the military security in Aleppo, and the commander and chief of the Syrian military police. He was the commander of the military police prior to being appointed minister of interior.

He was appointed interior minister in April 2011, replacing Said Mohammad Sammour.

Sanctions
On 9 May 2011, the European Union (EU) placed sanctions on Shaar along with 12 others. The Official Journal of the European Union states the reason for sanctions against him as "involvement in violent treatment of demonstrators". Swiss government also put him into sanction list in September 2011, citing the same reason given by the EU.

Personal life
Shaar is married and has two sons and three daughters. He is a Sunni Muslim.

Reports of death or injury
On 18 July 2012, there were conflicting reports on his fate, with CNN reporting that Syrian state run television confirmed that Shaar was killed following a bombing of a meeting of the Central Crisis Management Cell (CCMC) at the National Security headquarters in Damascus. However, later state TV reported that he survived although wounded. Additional reports stated that he, along with the country's intelligence chief, was in stable condition.

On 19 December 2012, reports surfaced that Shaar had been admitted to the American University in Beirut hospital in Lebanon a few days earlier, after sustaining unspecified injuries in a bombing. The attack took place in front of the ministry of interior in Damascus on 12 December, killing several and injuring more than 20. Shaar's injuries were not believed to be serious.

On 26 December 2012, Shaar was reported to have cut short his treatment in Beirut due to a belief that he might be arrested by Lebanese officials for his role in a massacre of hundreds of people in Tripoli in 1986 and that he may be subject to international arrest warrants. He then returned to Damascus.

See also
Cabinet of Syria

References

1950 births
Living people
Syrian ministers of interior
People of the Syrian civil war
People from Latakia Governorate
Syrian generals
Syrian Sunni Muslims
Arab Socialist Ba'ath Party – Syria Region politicians